Sincerità is the debut album released by Italian Singer Arisa,
It features the singles "Sincerità", "Io sono" and "Te lo volevo dire".
The album was certified gold by the Federation of the Italian Music Industry for domestic sales exceeding 30,000 units.

Track listing

Charts

References

2009 debut albums
Warner Music Group albums
Arisa albums
Italian-language albums